Kelly Versteeg (born 1994) is a retired Dutch tennis player.

In her career, she won nine doubles titles on the ITF Women's Circuit (all finals she played were at $10k level). She has career-high rankings by the Women's Tennis Association (WTA) of No. 497 in singles and 402 in doubles.

Versteeg made her WTA Tour main-draw debut at the 2017 Rosamlen Open, in the doubles draw, partnering Erika Vogelsang.

ITF Circuit finals

Singles: 6 (0–6)

Doubles: 17 (9–8)

References

External links
 
 

1994 births
Living people
Dutch female tennis players
20th-century Dutch women
21st-century Dutch women